USS Oosterdijk (ID-2586) was a United States Navy cargo ship in commission in 1918.

Construction, acquisition, and commissioning
Oosterdijk was a commercial cargo ship, with limited passenger accommodation, built as Irvine's Shipbuilding and Dry Docks Company Ltd.'s Yard No.522 at Middleton, West Hartlepool, England for Holland America Line (NV Nederlandsch-Amerikaansche Stoomvaart-Maatschappij - NASM) of Rotterdam. Launched on 21 February 1913, she entered service in May 1913.

On 20 March 1918, President Woodrow Wilson signed a proclamation declaring the American seizure of neutral ships under the right of angary — which in wartime allowed a belligerent power to use the property of a neutral country subject to full indemnification — and at Baltimore, Maryland, that day Oosterdijk became one of the first Dutch vessels so seized. She was interned at Baltimore on 21 March 1918. The U.S. Navy took control of Oosterdijk on 2 April 1918 for use during World War I. She was assigned the Naval Registry Identification Number (Id. No.) 2586 and commissioned as USS Oosterdijk.

United States Navy service
Oosterdijk was assigned to the Naval Overseas Transportation Service. After refitting at Baltimore and inspection by the 5th Naval District on 8 April 1918, she took on a cargo of general supplies at Baltimore. She next steamed to Norfolk, Virginia, to load naval stores, and then proceeded to New York City, where she joined a convoy destined for France. Departing in convoy on 25 April, she called at Brest, France, and then went on to discharge her general supplies and naval stores at St. Nazaire, France.

Oosterdijk departed St. Nazaire on 9 June for the return voyage to the United States and arrived Baltimore on 21 June.

Loss

Oosterdijk underwent minor repairs at Baltimore, loaded  of general cargo there, bunkered at Norfolk, and then departed New York City on 2 July for her second convoy transit to France, bound for St. Nazaire. During the voyage, on 9, 10, or 11 July she collided with the United States Army-chartered American cargo ship  in the North Atlantic Ocean. Both ships were seriously damaged and forced to turn about to steam for the nearest port.

Despite the efforts of her crew to save her, Oosterdijk had to be abandoned on either 10 or 11 July and sank at 15:30 that afternoon.

San Jacinto carried Oosterdijks crew members to Halifax, Nova Scotia, Canada.

Notes

References

Department of the Navy: Naval Historical Center Online Library of Selected Images:  U.S. Navy Ships: USS Oosterdijk (ID # 2586), 1918. Originally S.S. Oosterdijk (1913)
NavSource Online: Section Patrol Craft Photo Archive: Oosterdijk (ID 2586)

 

World War I cargo ships of the United States
Ships built on the River Tees
1913 ships
Shipwrecks in the Atlantic Ocean
Ships sunk in collisions
Passenger ships of the Netherlands
Cargo ships of the United States Navy
Maritime incidents in 1918